Muhammad, the final Islamic prophet, was born and lived in Mecca for the first 53 years of his life (c. 570–632 CE) until the Hijra. This period of his life is characterized by his proclamation of prophethood. Muhammad's father, Abdullah ibn Abd al-Muttalib, died before he was born. His mother would raise him until he was six years old, before her death around 577 CE at Abwa'. Subsequently raised by his grandfather, Abd al-Muttalib, and then his uncle, Abu Talib ibn ‘Abd al-Muttalib, Muhammad's early career involved being a shepherd and merchant. Muhammad married Khadija bint Khuwaylid after a successful trading endeavour in Syria. After the death of Khadija and Abu Talib in the Year of Sorrow, Muhammad married Sawda bint Zam'a and Aisha.

Muslims believe Muhammad began receiving revelation sometime in the year 610 CE. Initially, the ranks of the Muslims only included Muhammad and some of his close friends and relatives. However, as more members of the Quraysh and other Arab tribes respected his words and accepted his message, the vast majority of them, including tribal leaders and some of his relatives, such as Abū Lahab, opposed, ridiculed and eventually boycotted his clan, the Banu Hashim, and Muhammad and his followers were harassed, assaulted and forced into exile in Abyssinia. After experiencing the Isra and Mi'raj in 620 and receiving delegations from Medina and pledges of protection from the two Arab tribes that lived in the city at al-'Aqabah, Muhammad instructed his companions to gradually migrate to the city, before doing so himself in 622.

The Quran, early biographies of Muhammad (seerah), and hadith literature are some of the primary sources used by both early and modern historians in portraying this period of Muhammad's life. While questions have been raised regarding the certainty of some of these sources, most academics have come to accept these along with some of their revisions as the definitive sources for Muhammad's early life in Mecca.

Background
The Arabian Peninsula was largely arid and volcanic, making agriculture difficult except near oases or springs. Thus the Arabian landscape was dotted with towns and cities near those oases, two prominent of which were Mecca and Medina (then known as Yathrib). Communal life was essential for survival in desert conditions, as people needed support against the harsh environment and lifestyle. The tribal grouping was thus encouraged by the need to act as a unit. This unity was based on the bond of kinship by blood. People of Arabia were either nomadic or sedentary, the former constantly traveling from one place to another seeking water and pasture for their flocks, while the latter settled and focused on trade and agriculture. The survival of nomads (or bedouins) was also partially dependent on raiding caravans or oases; thus they saw this as no crime. Medina was a large flourishing agricultural settlement, while Mecca was an important financial center for many of the surrounding tribes.
In pre-Islamic Arabia gods or goddesses were viewed as protectors of individual tribes and their spirits were associated with sacred trees, stones, springs and wells. There was an important shrine in Mecca (called the Kaaba) that housed statues of 360 idols of tribal patron deities and was the site of an annual pilgrimage. Aside from these tribal gods, Arabs shared a common belief in a supreme deity Allah (akin to "God" in English, as opposed to "god") who was however remote from their everyday concerns and thus not the object of cult or ritual. Three goddesses were associated with Allah as his daughters: al-Lat, Manat and al-Uzza. Some monotheistic communities also existed in Arabia, including Christians and Jews. According to the tradition, Muhammad himself was a descendant of Ishmael, son of Abraham.

Genealogy, birth and childhood

Muhammad was born in the month of Rabi' al-Awwal. Islamic historians place the year of Muhammad's birth as 570. corresponding with the Year of the Elephant, however recent scholarship has suggested earlier dates for this event, including 568 and 569. The precise date of Muhammad's birth varies between different Islamic sects, with most Sunnis accepting the 12th of Rabi'-ul-Awwal as the date of his birth which is in ibn ishaq's opinion and there are more dates 2,8,10,rabiul awwaland other opinion as well while Shi'a Muslims believe it to have been the dawn of 17th day of same month. Muhammad was born into the family of Banu Hashim, one of the prominent clans forming the Quraysh tribe of Mecca, although the family seems to have not been as prosperous during Muhammad's early lifetime. His parents were 'Abdullah ibn 'Abd al-Muttalib of the Banu Hashim and Aminah bint Wahb, the sister of the then-chief of the Banu Zuhrah. Muhammad's paternal great-grandmother, Salma bint 'Amr, was an influential Jewish lady from the Khazraj tribe of Medina, thus Muhammad had mixed Arab-Jewish ancestry. According to Ibn Ishaq, an early biographer of Muhammad, 'Abd al-Muttalib, Muhammad's grandfather, came up with the child's name, which was quite unknown at the time in the Arabian Peninsula.

Muhammad's father, Abdullah, died almost six month before he was born. Muhammad was sent to live with a Bedouin family in the desert soon after his birth, as the desert life was considered healthier for infants. Because he was fatherless, wet nurses refused to take him, fearing that it would not be profitable to take care of an orphan. However, he was accepted by Halimah bint Abi Dhuayb al-Sa'diyyah, who had found no child to take care of. Muhammad stayed with Halimah and her husband until he was two or three years old. He lived with his mother in Mecca for the next three years until she took him to Medina (then known as Yathrib) to visit his maternal relatives, and died on the way back around Abwa'. Having lost both his parents, Muhammad's grandfather, 'Abd al-Muttalib, took over custodianship of the child. Two years later, his grandfather died and Muhammad was raised under the care of his uncle Abu Talib, the leader of the Banu Hashim. While living with his uncle, Muhammad began tending flocks of sheep on the outskirts of Mecca to earn his living. He also accompanied his uncle on several of his commercial journeys. These journeys exposed Muhammad to cultural diversity and varying religious traditions. At the age of 9, he went with his uncle Abu Talib on a business journey to Syria, where Muslims believe he met Bahira in the town of Bosra, who foretold his prophecy.

Adulthood prior to revelation
Later in his life, influenced by the commercial journeys with his uncle, Muhammad worked as a merchant and was involved in trade between the Indian Ocean and the Mediterranean. During his career as a merchant, Muhammad became known as "the Trustworthy" and was sought out as an impartial arbitrator of disputes.

After parts the Kaaba were destroyed in flash floods, with the reconstruction almost complete, disagreements arose among the leaders of the different clans of the Quraysh as to which one should put the Black Stone into place. These disagreements led to an escalation in tensions, and war seemed imminent before they agreed to take the advice of the next person entering the Haram. Muslims believe Muhammad was this person, and that he spread out his cloak, put the stone in the middle and had the members of the four major clans raise it to its destined position, before ensuring its secure placement with his own hands.

Marriage to Khadija bint Khuwaylid and adoption of Zayd ibn Haritha

Khadija bint Khuwaylid, a female merchant and widower, asked Muhammad to manage her commercial operations in Syria after hearing of his trustworthiness. Impressed with the extraordinary success of Muhammad's leadership, Khadija sent a marriage proposal to Muhammad through her friend Nafisa. Muhammad accepted the proposal and married Khadija. Khadija gave Muhammad the slave boy Zayd ibn Harithah, whom Muhammad would adopt later. Ibn Ishaq records that Khadija bore Muhammad six children: a boy named Al Qasim (who would die at the age of two), then four girls, Zaynab, Ruqayyah, Umm Kulthum, Fatimah, and another boy, Abdullah (who also died at two).

Due to the death of Abdullah, Muhammad's desire to relieve his uncle Abu Talib of the burden of providing for a large family, and Abu Talib's financial situation, Muhammad took Abu Talib's son and his cousin, Ali, into his own home. Muhammad also adopted Zayd, giving him the name Zayd ibn Muhammad. Muslims believe that this renaming was rendered invalid by the revelation of some verses in Surah 33 of the Qur'an, Al Aḥzāb, wherein it is stated that an adopted child could not be treated as a natural son by marriage or inheritance. Consequently, the adopted child had to retain the name of his or her biological father. Therefore, Zayd's name was reverted to Zayd ibn Haritha.

Early revelations and opposition

At some point, Muhammad adopted the practice of meditating alone for several weeks every year in a cave on Mount Hira near Mecca. Islamic belief holds that in one of his visits to Mount Hira in the year 610, 13 years before the Hijra, the angel Gabriel began communicating with and commanded Muhammad to recite the following verses of the 96th Surah of the Quran, Al 'Alaq:
Proclaim! (or read!) in the name of thy Lord and Cherisher, Who created- Created man, out of a (mere) clot of congealed blood: Proclaim! And thy Lord is Most Bountiful,- He Who taught (the use of) the pen,- Taught man that which he knew not. (Qur'an )

Most Sunni traditions believe that upon receiving his first revelations Muhammad was deeply distressed, but the spirit moved closer and told him that he had been chosen as a messenger of God, and that Muhammad returned home and was consoled and reassured by Khadija and her Christian cousin, Waraqah ibn Nawfal. Shiite Muslims maintain that Muhammad was neither surprised nor frightened at the appearance of Gabriel but rather welcomed him as if he had been expecting him. The initial revelation was followed by a pause of three years during which Muhammad gave himself up further to prayers and spiritual practices. When the revelations resumed he was reassured and commanded to begin preaching: Your lord has not forsaken you nor does he hate [you] (Qur'an )According to Welch, these revelations were accompanied by mysterious seizures, and the reports are unlikely to have been forged by later Muslims. W. Montgomery Watt further adds that Muhammad was confident that he could distinguish his own thoughts from these messages.

Mission and early efforts
Muhammad's early efforts in preaching the new faith focused on the preaching of a single ideal: monotheism. Surahs of the Quran believed to have been revealed during this period, known as the Meccan surahs, command Muhammad to proclaim and praise the name of Allah, instruct him not to worship idols or associate other deities with Allah and to worship Him alone, warn the pagans of their eschatological punishment, sometimes referring to the Day of Judgement indirectly, while providing examples from the history of some extinct communities. Early converts to Islam included Muhammad's wife, Khadija, his cousin Ali, his adopted son Zayd, his nursemaid Umm Ayman, and his friend Abu Bakr.

Very few of the Quraysh gave weight to Muhammad's message; most ignored it and a few mocked him. According to Welch, early Qur'anic verses were not "based on a dogmatic conception of monotheism but on a strong general moral and religious appeal," further adding that the key themes of these Meccan surahs include the moral responsibility of man towards his creator: the resurrection of the dead, the Day of Judgement supplemented with vivid descriptions of the tortures in hell and pleasures in paradise, the wonders of nature and everyday life, the signs of God, and the proof of the existence of a greater power who will take into account the greed of people and their suppression of the poor. The foundations of early religious duties were also laid and included belief in God, asking for forgiveness of sins, offering frequent prayers, assisting others with emphasis on those in need, ejecting cheating and the love of wealth, chastity, and the prevention of femicide which was prevalent in early Arabia.

There were three main groups of early converts to Islam: younger brothers and sons of great merchants, people who had fallen out of the first rank in their tribe or failed to attain it, and the weak, mostly unprotected, foreigners. Abu Bakr, who used to purchase slaves to set them free in accordance with Muhammad's principle of equality, attracted a large number of converts. Nevertheless, the number of these early converts remained small, and Muhammad concentrated on quietly building a small, but spiritually strong, community. Around 613, the Quran commanded Muhammad to "admonish your nearest kinsmen," initiating the phase of public preaching. One day, Muhammad climbed the As Safa mountain, and called out the tribal chiefs. After receiving assurances that the chiefs, who reportedly never heard Muhammad tell lies, would believe him, he declared the Oneness of God. Later Muhammad organized dinners in which he conveyed and advocated the substance of his message. At these events, Muhammad met fierce opposition from one of his uncles, Abu Lahab, while others such as Hamza ibn Abd al-Muttalib and al-'Abbas accepted him. Several reasons have been given for the resentment of the Quraysh toward Muhammad's message, the most accepted is that the Quraysh also did not accept Muhammad as a prophet since he came from a clan less powerful than his opponents'.

Opposition and persecution of early Muslims

Conservative opposition arose to Muhammad's speeches. According to Ibn Sa'd, the opposition in Mecca began with Muhammad delivering verses that "spoke shamefully of the idols [the Meccans] worshiped other than [Allah] and mentioned the perdition of their fathers who died in disbelief." According to Watt, as Muhammad's followers gained traction in Mecca, they posed a new, internal threat to the local tribes and the rulers of the city, whose wealth rested upon the annual pilgrimage to the Kaaba, the focal point of Meccan religious life, which Muhammad threatened to overthrow; his denunciation of the Meccan traditional religion was especially offensive to his own tribe, the Quraysh, as they were the guardians of the Ka'aba. Some of the ranking and influential leaders of the Quraysh tried and failed to come to arrangements with Muhammad in exchange for abandoning his preaching. They offered him admission into the inner circle of merchants and establishing his position in the circle by an advantageous marriage, but Muhammad refused. During this period, Muhammad urged his followers to be pacifist; according to Peterson, to "deal gently with the infidels".

Relations between Muhammad's Islamic faction and the other members of the Quraysh rapidly deteriorated. Muhammad's open denunciation of the Meccan idols provoked hostile reactions, and he was mainly protected from physical harm for he belonged to the Banu Hashim; injuring Muhammad threatened to open up a blood feud between the Banu Hashim and the rest of the Quraysh, undermining the legitimacy and morality of the tribal leaders, thus, the Quraysh were reluctant to hurt or kill Muhammad. Regardless, several attempts were made at Muhammad's life. Traditional Islamic accounts maintain that the Quraysh first taunted Muslims by interrupting their prayers. Western scholars have accepted records of persecution and ill-treatment of Muhammad's followers. Many of Muhammad's followers were harassed, assaulted and forced into exile—and two, Yasir bin 'Amir and Sumayya bint Khabbat, were tortured and killed.

In 615, at a time of heightened violence against the Muslims, Muhammad arranged for his followers to emigrate to the Kingdom of Aksum and found a small colony there under the protection of the Christian king, al-Negashi. While the traditions view the persecutions of Meccans to have played the major role in the emigration, William Montgomery Watt, a professor of Islamic studies, states "there is reason to believe that some sort of division within the embryonic Muslim community played a role and that some of the emigrants may have gone to Abyssinia to engage in trade, possibly in competition with prominent merchant families in Mecca." The Meccans sent Amr ibn al-As and Abdullah ibn Rabi'ah to negotiate the surrender of the Muslims to the Quraysh, however, the Negus refused their request.

Umar's acceptance of Islam and banishment of the Hashemites

Sunni Muslims believe Muhammad prayed for the strengthening of the cause of Islam through the conversion of either Umar ibn al-Khattab or Amr ibn Hishām. Umar initially reacted to Muhammad's preaching by ardently opposing it. Angered by Muhammad's preaching which had led to divisions within Meccan society, he eventually decided to kill Muhammad, whom he held responsible for the divisions. While en route to assassinate Muhammad, Umar was informed of his sister's conversion to Islam. Approaching his sister's house, he heard her reciting the Quran. Eventually considering the words beautiful and noble, Umar converted to Islam, making his conversion public instantly. Tempered by Umar's conversion, Muslims could now pray openly at the Kaaba, as the pagans were reluctant to confront Umar, known for his forceful character.

Two important clans of Quraysh declared a public banishment against the clan of Banu Hashim in order to put pressure on the clan to withdraw their protection of Muhammad. The terms imposed on Banu Hashim, as reported by Ibn Ishaq, were that "no one should marry their women nor give women for them to marry; and that no one should either buy from them or sell to them." The banishment lasted for two or three years but eventually collapsed mainly because it was not achieving its purpose and sympathizers of the Hashemites within the Quraysh finally united to annul the agreement.

Events leading up to the Hijra

Deaths of Khadija and Abu Talib and Muhammad's visit to Ta'if

9 years into Muhammad's claim to prophethood, two of the most committed defenders of Muhammad's message, his wife Khadija and his uncle Abu Talib, died. With the death of Abu Talib, the leadership of the clan of Banu Hashim was passed to another uncle of Muhammad, Abu Lahab, an inveterate enemy of Muhammad and Islam. Abu Lahab soon withdrew the clan's protection from Muhammad, placing Muhammad in mortal danger since the withdrawal of clan protection implied that the blood revenge for his killing would not be exacted. Muhammad then tried to find a protector for himself in another important Arabian city close to Mecca, Ta'if, but his effort failed as he was pelted with stones in the city.

Marriages to Sawda bint Zam'a and Aisha

Sometime in 620, the year following the Year of Sorrow, Muhammad sent a proposal of marriage to Sawda bint Zam'a, an early convert to Islam. The proposal was accepted by both her and her father, Zam'a ibn Qays. Muhammad and Sawda were married in Ramadan of that year. Muhammad also married Aisha, a daughter of his friend and companion Abu Bakr, when she was somewhere between 6 and 9 years old, which has caused controversy in modern scholarly discussion. Both Sawda and Aisha would outlive Muhammad, dying around sometime between 642–672 and in 678, respectively. Aisha would narrate more than 2,200 hadiths in the 44 years she lived after Muhammad, covering several diverse topics, including inheritance, pilgrimage, eschatology and Muhammad's private life.

Isra, Mi'raj, and pledges at al-'Aqabah

Some time in 620, Muhammad told his followers that he had experienced the Isra and Mi'raj, a supernatural journey to Jerusalem (Isra) and ascension to the Seven Heavens (Mi'raj), said to have been accomplished in one night along with the angel Gabriel. Muhammad is said to have toured heaven and hell, and spoken with earlier prophets, including Adam, Ibrahim, Musa, and Isa. Ibn Ishaq, author of first biography of Muhammad, presents this event as a spiritual experience while later historians like al-Tabari and Ibn Kathir present it as a physical journey. Some western scholars of Islam hold that the oldest Muslim tradition identified as a journey traveled through the heavens from the sacred enclosure at Mecca to the Bayt al-Ma'mur (a celestial recreation of the Kaaba); others identify it as Muhammad's journey from Mecca to the Bayt al-Maqdis in Jerusalem.
Since the Quraysh gave little weight to Muhammad's message, Muhammad took to spreading his message to the merchants and pilgrims that frequented Mecca. After several unsuccessful negotiations, he found hope with some men from Medina. The Arab population of Yathrib were somewhat familiar with monotheism because a Jewish community existed in that city. Muhammad met with a few members of the two tribes of Medina, the Aws and Khazraj, twice, at a hill known as al-'Aqabah near Mina, where they pledged their allegiance to Muhammad and agreed to protect Muhammad if he were to migrate to Medina. Following the pledges at al-'Aqabah, Muhammad encouraged his followers to emigrate to Medina. The Quraysh attempted to stop the Muslims from emigrating to the city, however, almost all Muslims managed to leave.

Hijra

Muslims believe Muhammad waited until he was commanded by Allah to migrate to Medina. Upon receiving this divine direction, Muhammad planned to leave Mecca the same night. The Quraysh had besieged his house hearing of the large numbers of Muslims who had emigrated prior to him. Muhammad slipped from his home the night of the planned assassination. Due to his possession of several articles that belonged to members of the Quraysh, Muhammad asked Ali to stay behind to settle his outstanding financial obligations. Ali had worn Muhammad's cloak, leading the assassins to think Muhammad had not yet departed. By the time the assassins realised this, Muhammad had already left the city with Abu Bakr. Ali survived the plot, but risked his life again by staying in Mecca to carry out Muhammed's instructions: to restore to their owners all the goods and properties that had been entrusted to Muhammad for safekeeping. Ali then went to Medina with his mother, Fatima bint Asad, and Muhammed's daughters, Fatimah and Umm Kulthum as well as two other women, Muhammad's wife, Sawda, and wetnurse, Umm Ayman. Muhammad and Abu Bakr took refuge in a cave atop the Thawr mountain outside Mecca before continuing their journey. To further delude the Quraysh, Muhammad travelled south for the first few days of his journey, in the opposite direction to Medina. Later, Muhammad and Abu Bakr turned to the Red Sea, following the coastline up to Medina, arriving at Quba' on Monday, 27 September 622.

Historiography and sources

The Quran is the only primary source for the life of Muhammad in Mecca. The text of the Quran is generally considered by university scholars to record the words spoken by Muhammad as the search for variants in Western academia has not yielded any differences of great significance. The Quran, however, mainly records the ideological and spiritual considerations of Muhammad, and only fragmentarily references to the details of his life in the city, which makes it difficult to reconstruct the chronological order of the incidents in his or his followers' lives in Mecca. Modern biographers of Muhammad try to reconstruct the socioeconomic and sociopolitical aspects of Mecca and read the ideological aspects of the Quran in that context.

Other later historical works, particularly those of the 3rd and 4th century of the Islamic calendar, are also of considerable importance in mapping Muhammad's life in the city. These include the early biographies of Muhammad (seerah), particularly those written by Ibn Ishaq (–767 CE) and Ibn Sa'd (–845 CE), and quotes attributed to Muhammad in hadith literature, compiled by Islamic scholars such as Al Bukhari (–870 CE) and Muslim ibn Hajjaj (–875 CE) which provide further information on his life. The earliest surviving seerah is the "Sīrah Rasūl Allah" by Ibn Ishaq. Although the original is lost, portions of it survive in the recensions of Ibn Hisham and al-Tabari. Many historians accept the accuracy of these biographies, though their accuracy is unascertainable. According to William Montgomery Watt, in the legal sphere, it would seem that sheer invention could have very well happened. In the historical sphere, however, aside from exceptional cases, the material may have been subject to "tendential shaping" rather than being completely fabricated.

Hadiths are the record of the traditions or sayings of Muhammad, defined as the biography of Muhammad perpetuated by the long memory of his companions and community for their exemplification and obedience. The development of hadiths is a vital contributive element to the biography of Muhammad in early Islamic history. There had been a common tendency among earlier western scholars against these narrations and reports gathered in later periods, who regarded them as fabrications. Leone Caetani considered the attribution of historical reports to Abdullah ibn 'Abbas and 'Aisha as mostly fictitious while examining accounts reported without sanad by the early compilers of seerah such as Ibn Ishaq. Wilferd Madelung has rejected the stance of indiscriminately dismissing everything. Madelung and some later historians do not reject the narrations which have been compiled in later periods and try to judge them in the context of history and on the basis of their compatibility with the events and figures.

Sunni Muslims consider the Sahih al-Bukhari and Sahih Muslim, the collection of hadiths made by Al Bukhari and Muslim ibn Hajjaj, to be the most authoritative hadith collections. Al Bukhari is said to have spent over 16 years gathering over 1,600,000 hadiths and finding the best 7,397 of them. Most of these traditions deal with the life of Muhammad. For Shiites, the words and deeds of their Imams, the progeny of Muhammad, are given that authority. Originally transmitted from generation to generation orally before being compiled, some of these sayings, according to their chain of transmission, are sayings of Muhammad.

See also
 History of Islam
 Hijra
 Timeline of Islamic history

References

Citations

Works cited
Bowersock, Glen Warren; Grabar Oleg (1999). Late Antiquity: A Guide to the Postclassical World. Harvard University Press. .

 

 
 

 

Rodinson, Maxime, Muhammad: Prophet of Islam, Tauris Parke Paperbacks, 2002.

Encyclopediae

Mecca
History of Mecca